Yass Valley Way is the main road which links Yass, New South Wales to the Hume Highway (to Sydney and Melbourne) and to the Barton Highway (to Canberra) in Australia. The road is about 18 km long and runs parallel to the Yass River. It was created when the Hume Highway bypass of Yass was built in the early 1990s. This cleared the massive traffic bottleneck that plagued Yass due to the passing interstate traffic. After the completion of the bypass, local traffic predominates.

See also

 List of highways in New South Wales
 Highways in Australia
 Old Hume Highway

References

Highways in New South Wales
Yass Valley Council